Moscow Nights (released as I Stand Condemned in the United States) is a 1935 British drama film directed by Anthony Asquith and starring Laurence Olivier, Penelope Dudley-Ward and Harry Baur. The screenplay concerns a wounded officer who falls in love with his nurse.

Based on a novel by Pierre Benoit, it is a remake of the 1934 French film of the same title. Harry Baur was the only actor to reprise his role from the original. It was shot at Denham and Isleworth Studios, both controlled by Alexander Korda's London Films. The film's sets were designed by the art director Vincent Korda. It was released in the United States by United Artists.

Plot summary
During the First World War a wounded Russian officer Captain Ignatoff falls in love with his nurse. Matters are complicated by the fact that she is already engaged to a wealthy merchant.

Cast
 Harry Baur as Brioukov
 Penelope Dudley-Ward as Natasha
 Laurence Olivier as Captain Ignatoff
 Athene Seyler as Madame Sabline
 Lilian Braithwaite as Countess
 Morton Selten as Kovrin
 Sam Livesey as Fedor
 Robert Cochran as Polonsky
 Hay Petrie as Spy
 Walter Hudd as The Doctor
 Kate Cutler as Madame Kovrin
 C. M. Hallard as President of Court Martial
 Charles Carson as Officer of Defence
 Edmund Willard as Officer of Prosecution
 Morland Graham as Bioukov's Servant

Critical response
Writing for The Spectator in 1935, Graham Greene called the film "completely bogus", and "the worst, as well as the most ballyhooed, film of the year". Asquith and Dudley-Ward were criticized in particular, with Greene describing Asquith's direction as puerile, and Dudley-Ward's acting as "country-house charades". Although Greene praised the acting from the rest of the film's stars, and noted that Asquith's past direction had been characterized by trickery, he commented that "now [Asquith's] bag of tricks seems empty".

References

Bibliography
 Low, Rachael. Filmmaking in 1930s Britain. George Allen & Unwin, 1985.
 Wood, Linda. British Films, 1927-1939. British Film Institute, 1986.

External links
 

1935 films
1935 drama films
Films about gambling
Films directed by Anthony Asquith
British drama films
British remakes of French films
Films set in 1916
Films set in Russia
World War I spy films
British black-and-white films
Films based on works by Pierre Benoit
United Artists films
Films shot at Isleworth Studios
1930s English-language films
1930s British films